The Davy Sound  is a sound in King Christian X Land, Northeast Greenland. Administratively it is part of the Northeast Greenland National Park zone.

History
The sound was named and put on the map by William Scoresby (1789 – 1857) in 1822 in honour of Cornish chemist and inventor Sir Humphry Davy (1778 – 1829), president of the Royal Society from 1820 to 1827. 

In 1899, during the Swedish Greenland Expedition on which Swedish Arctic explorer Alfred Gabriel Nathorst found and first mapped King Oscar Fjord, he made southwards for the Davy Sound after having entered from Antarctic Sound. But Davy sound was blocked by ice and Nathorst had to travel back north.

Nathorst proposed 72° 10′ N as the northern limit of Davy Sound, which is roughly the present day geographic limit. Lieut. P. F. White of the Cambridge Expedition to East Greenland suggested that the limit of the Davy Sound should be expanded until 72° 30′, at the bend in the fjord trending northward —near the mouth of Segelsällskapet Fjord. This proposal, by which the length of the Davy Sound would be greater than that corresponding to King Oscar Fjord, has not found wide acceptance.

Geography
The Davy Sound separates the northeastern shore of Jameson Land —part of the Greenland mainland— from the southwestern shore of Traill Island. Cape Simpson rises on the northeastern side of the mouth of the sound and Cape Biot on the southwestern.  

Even in the summertime the channel is usually encumbered by ice and tidal currents are strong and dangerous for navigation.

See also
List of fjords of Greenland

References

External links 
Explanatory notes to the Geological map of Greenland
Antarctic Havn

Sounds of North America
Straits of Greenland
Fjords of Greenland